Henry George John Veitch (26 September 1833 – 30 May 1903) was an English first-class cricketer and clergyman.

The son of William Douglas Veitch, he was born in September 1833 at Sopley, Hampshire. He later studied at Balliol College, Oxford where he played first-class cricket for Oxford University. He made his debut against the Marylebone Cricket Club (MCC) at Oxford in 1854. Veitch played first-class cricket for Oxford until 1856, making eight appearances. In his eight matches for Oxford, he scored 149 runs at an average of 18.62 and a high score of 38. He also played two first-class matches for the MCC in 1856 against Sussex and Kent. In his ten first-class matches, he took 7 wickets. 

After graduating from Oxford, Veitch took holy orders in the Church of England and became the vicar of Kilmersdon, Somerset in 1864. He married Sibella Matilda Cameron, daughter of Clan Cameron chief Donald Cameron, 23rd Lochiel in 1865. He died in Scotland at Sanquhar in May 1903.

References

External links

1833 births
1903 deaths
People from New Forest District
Alumni of Balliol College, Oxford
English cricketers
Oxford University cricketers
19th-century English Anglican priests
20th-century English Anglican priests